Cantos Aztecas is a 1988 album of songs in the Aztec language composed by Lalo Schifrin and sung by Plácido Domingo.

References

1988 albums
1980s classical albums
Lalo Schifrin albums
Plácido Domingo albums